Zanzan Region is a defunct region of Ivory Coast. From 1997 to 2011, it was a first-level subdivision region. The region's capital was Bondoukou and its area was 38,251 km². Since 2011, the area formerly encompassed by the region is co-extensive with Zanzan District.

Administrative divisions
At the time of its dissolution, Zanzan Region was divided into seven departments: Bondoukou, Bouna, Koun-Fao, Nassian, Sandégué, Tanda, and Transua.

Abolition
Zanzan Region was abolished as part of the 2011 administrative reorganisation of the subdivisions of Ivory Coast. The area formerly encompassed by the region is now the same territory as Zanzan District.

References

Former regions of Ivory Coast
States and territories disestablished in 2011
2011 disestablishments in Ivory Coast
1997 establishments in Ivory Coast
States and territories established in 1997